Larry Reid may refer to:

 Larry Reid (musician), musician with The Cinematics
 Larry Reid (councilmember), city council member in Oakland, California
 Larry Reid (basketball), coached the Tennessee State Tigers basketball team

See also
Larry Reed (disambiguation)